Lewis County Courthouse in Hohenwald, Tennessee is a historic courthouse building built in 1939 that is listed on the National Register of Historic Places.

It was deemed significant as "an excellent local example of Public Works Administration (PWA) Modern architecture". It was funded by the Public Works Administration, was designed by Nashville architects Hart & Russell, and was built by Nashville contractor Chrichlow & Yearwood.  It is a red brick building.  It has three original jail cells on its third floor.

References

External links

Art Deco architecture in Tennessee
Buildings and structures in Lewis County, Tennessee
Courthouses on the National Register of Historic Places in Tennessee
County courthouses in Tennessee
National Register of Historic Places in Lewis County, Tennessee